Koomba Park is one of the parks comprising the Dandenong Valley Parklands in the eastern suburbs of Melbourne, Australia. It is managed primarily by VicRoads and Parks Victoria. The park opened in December 1981, and its land was previously used for cattle grazing and apple orchards. The surrounding area is still used for grazing. There are three major power transmission lines running through the park: Rowville-Templestowe Single Circuit Southern (first and second), and Rowville-Ringwood.

In 2019, a study found that Koomba Park was one of the least used areas of the Dandenong Valley Parklands, and also garnered the least satisfaction from park users when compared to Jells Park and Tirhatuan Park.

Ecology
The park forms part of the wildlife corridor of Dandenong Creek, and contains a large amount of riparian forest, as well as wetlands and swamps and some areas of indigenous revegetation. Common mammals in the park include various species of bats, possums, and sugar gliders. There is a bird hide adjacent to one of the ponds, from which many species of native birds are observable. The park also provides habitat to a variety of indigenous plant species, many of which are threatened or endangered. Koomba Park has several man-made water bodies, and is classified in the Urban Floodway Zone since it is prone to inundation.

Paths and trails

Cycle paths
Both Dandenong Creek Trail and EastLink Trail run through the park on the primary north–south concrete path, before the trails split near the southern car park. A new path of the same standard was constructed which leads further south to the Mountain Highway intersection with Burwood Highway, which forms part of the EastLink Trail, opened in mid-2008. The primary path exit at the north of the park leads under Boronia Road and continues to run alongside the Dandenong Creek while the southern path (the EastLink Trail) leads further along EastLink to the south, and the southwest path (the Dandenong Creek Trail) crosses the Dandenong Creek and meets the Burwood Highway in Vermont South, with this link being constructed as a boardwalk and opened in 1997.

Koomba Park constitutes part of the Opperman Trails, a tribute to cyclist Sir Hubert Opperman. The Lands End Trail is signposted through the park, including an information board about Opperman.

Walking paths
There are also a criss-crossing series of official fine/coarse gravel trails in the park east of the Dandenong Creek, which are designed specifically for hikers although can be used by cyclists. These paths are usually very poorly maintained, with many sections bumpy, narrow and puddled, even impassable due to overgrowth scrubs and fallen trees. A number of unofficial desire paths have also been created by visitors making shortcuts in the park.

There is an elevated boardwalk winding southwesterly through the Dandenong Creek wetlands, serving as section of the Dandenong Creek Trail. Although the boardwalk is covered with metal wire mesh to improve traction, all cyclists are required to dismount and push-walk through the boardwalk, however it is still common to see cyclists outright ignore the warning signs and ride the whole way through with speed. Halfway along the boardwalk, it crosses the Dandenong Creek to the western bank, and there is one spot where hikers can get off the boardwalk (via a mound ramp in the wetland ) before the trail continues on to the Burwood Highway exit.

Facilities
Koommba Park has a large carpark at the southern end, on a service road off Mountain Highway, which is shared with Wantirna Reserve. There is another smaller carpark at the northern end off Boronia Road. A joint picnic shelter and toilet block (which was originally a sports pavilion) existed in the park for some time, but was demolished in mid-2008 due to numerous crime incidents . Electric barbecues were also removed at the same time. Information boards are located at the north and south pedestrian entrances to the park. A drinking fountain is also located at the junction of Dandenong Creek Trail and EastLink Trail.

Wantirna Reserve
The adjoining Wantirna Reserve, managed by Knox City Council and located at the southern end of the park, features a sporting oval with an adjacent clubhouse and cricket nets which caters for Australian rules football and cricket. The reserve also contains the Wantirna Tennis Club, as well as a scout hall and playground. All facilities are accessed by dirt roads with parking areas provided. The Victorian Jazz Archive is also located on the left side of the southern entrance to Koomba Park.

Incidents
The park is known by locals and the Victoria Police to be a meeting point for drug deals and gay sex, due to its remoteness from residential areas and densely wooded forests, especially at night. There have been several attempts to decrease criminal activity in the park, including regular patrolling. In 2006, the male toilets were permanently closed in a bid to curb gay sex meetings. In late 2008, the entire toilet block/picnic shelter was demolished in a further effort.

On 7 May 2010 at approximately 1 am, a drug deal in the park lead to the stabbing murder of a 41-year-old man from Dandenong.

In 2010, a 50-year-old man fell from an elevated boardwalk in Koomba Park whilst cycling, suffering fatal injuries.

References

External links
 Koomba Park at Parks Victoria
 Dandenong Valley Parklands map at Parks Victoria
 

Parks in Melbourne
City of Knox